Neoblastobasis spiniharpella is a moth in the family Blastobasidae. It was described by Vladimir Ivanovitsch Kuznetzov and Sergej Yurjevitsch Sinev in 1985. It is found in Korea, Russia and Japan.

Larvae have been recorded feeding on Quercus (oak) cones.

References

Blastobasidae
Moths described in 1985